Events from the year 1653 in Denmark.

Incumbents 
 Monarch – Frederick III
 Steward of the Realm – Joachim Gersdorff

Events

Culture

Art
 Jørgen Ringnis completes the altarpiece for Nørre Alslev Church.

Births 
 2 April – Prince George of Denmark, husband of Queen Anne (died 1708 in England)

Deaths 
 21 May – Jacob Madsen, merchant (born 1597)

References 

 
Denmark
Years of the 17th century in Denmark